Eddie Lee Phillips (born September 29, 1961) is an American former professional basketball player of the NBA. At a height of 6'7", he played at the power forward position.

College career
Born in Birmingham, Alabama, Phillips was a graduate of the University of Alabama, where he played college basketball with the Crimson Tide. He averaged 16.4 points and 9.9 rebounds per game, during his college basketball career.

Professional career
Philipps was drafted by the New Jersey Nets in the 1982 NBA Draft, with the number 21 pick overall, but he played in only one season in the NBA, averaging 3.2 points and 1.6 rebounds per game, in 48 games played.

He later starred in professional leagues in Italy, Spain, and Israel.

References

External links
 Eddie Phillips at Basketball-Reference.com
 Italian League Profile 
 Spanish League Profile 

1961 births
Living people
Alabama Crimson Tide men's basketball players
American expatriate basketball people in Argentina
American expatriate basketball people in Israel
American expatriate basketball people in Italy
American expatriate basketball people in Spain
American men's basketball players
Basketball players from Birmingham, Alabama
CB Canarias players
Ferro Carril Oeste basketball players
Fulgor Libertas Forlì players
Hapoel Holon players
Liga ACB players
New Jersey Nets draft picks
New Jersey Nets players
Power forwards (basketball)